The 2011 Tour of Beijing was the inaugural running of the Tour of Beijing cycling stage race. It started with an individual time trial around the Beijing Olympic Village on 5 October and finished at the Bird's Nest on 9 October.

It was the 25th race of the UCI World Tour season.

The race was won by  rider Tony Martin, after winning the opening time trial stage and maintaining his advantage to the end of the race. In the race's other classifications, Denis Galimzyanov of  won the points classification, 's Igor Antón won the mountains classification, Ben King finished on top of the young rider classification, with  topping the teams classification.

Stages

Teams
As the race was held under the auspices of the UCI World Tour, all eighteen ProTour teams were invited automatically. Together with a selection of Chinese riders forming the Chinese National Cycling Team this formed the event's 19-team peloton.

The 19 teams invited to the race were:

Stages

Stage 1
5 October 2011 – Bird's Nest to Water Cube,

Stage 2
6 October 2011 – Bird's Nest to MenTouGou,

Stage 3
7 October 2011 – MenTouGou to YongNing Town,

Stage 4
8 October 2011 – YanQing Gui Chuan Square to Shunyi Olympic Rowing-Canoeing Park,

Stage 5
9 October 2011 – Tiananmen Square to Bird's Nest,

Classification leadership

References

Tour of Beijing
Tour of Beijing
Tour of Beijing
2010s in Beijing